The Brevoort River is a  river on the Upper Peninsula of Michigan in the United States. It begins at the outlet of Brevoort Lake and flows in a highly winding course ultimately southwards to Lake Michigan.

See also
List of rivers of Michigan

References

Michigan  Streamflow Data from the USGS

Rivers of Michigan
Tributaries of Lake Michigan